The Shelburne Muskies are a men's senior hockey team based out of Shelburne, Ontario, Canada.  They play in the Western Ontario Athletic Association Senior Hockey League.

Championships
In 1982, the Muskies won their eighth COHL title since 1935.  Their seventh came in 1972.

The Shelburne Muskies have won one championship, in 1997–98 when they were crowned WOAA Sr. "A" champions. Head coach was Barry Trood and assistant coach was Mark Taylor, trainers Sue Snider and Charmaine Archbold. The Muskies faced off against the Arthur Tigers in the first round, defeating them 4 games to 2. In the semifinals the first-place Muskies in the North played another tough series against the second-place Wiarton Redmen with the Muskies once again coming out on top, winning that series in six games including game 6 in Wiarton. 
The final had the Muskies playing a best-of-five series against the south champion "Clinton Radars". The Muskies took the championship 3 games to 0 including what was one of the best goaltending performances by two goaltenders ever in the Shelburne arena in game 3. Ron Webster managed to stone the Radars through near 6 periods of hockey in game 3 as the Muskies won the championship with a 1-0 double-overtime win. Over 130 shots were fired combined before defenceman Scruton scored in the second O/T period. Mike Murray was the captain of the team and the championship was dedicated to late longtime Muskies booster Clarence "Fleet" White.

2006–07 Muskies season
After starting off the season pretty average, sitting with a 6-4-0 record in their first ten games, the Muskies turned it up a notch and finished the year 12-2-0, finishing in 2nd place in the North Division, and qualifying for the WOAA Sr. "AA" playoffs.

They faced off against the Tavistock Royals in the quarter-finals, and quickly fell behind them two games to none before storming back and taking a 3-2 lead in the series.  However, the Muskies could not close out the series, as Tavistock rallied back and won the series in seven games.

2007–08 Muskies season
Shelburne would have another strong regular season, finishing the season with an 18-7-1 record, and finishing in fourth place in the North Division to qualify for the "AA" playoffs.

The Muskies would open the playoffs against the Tavistock Royals, who finished with the best record in the league.  Shelburne surprised the Royals in the series opener, winning 6-5 on the road, but Tavistock stormed back with a 6-1 win in the second game.  The Muskies would put up a good fight in the third game, but fell short, losing 4-2, then losing a wild fourth game, which saw the Muskies come back from a 6-1 deficit to take the game into overtime, but allowed the game-winning goal within the first minute of the extra period.  Shelburne could not rebound from the loss, as Tavistock closed out the series in the fifth game, eliminating the Muskies for the second straight season in the quarter-finals.

2008–09 Muskies season
The Muskies would have a very solid regular season, finishing third in the WOAA North Division with a record of 15-5-0, earning 30 points.  Shelburne scored a WOAA high 142 goals, which included a 20-0 shutout victory against the Nottawasaga River Rats.

Shelburne faced the Ripley Wolves in the "AA" qualification round, with the winner of the best of seven series advancing to the "AA" quarter-finals.  The Muskies opened the series with a solid 5-3 victory, followed by a blowout 7-1 win in the second game to take control of the series.  In the third game, the Wolves were able to keep the score close, however, Shelburne prevailed with a 5-3 victory to take a 3-0 series lead.  The fourth game was another close one, and the Muskies were able to hold off Ripley for a 5-4 victory to sweep the series and advance to the "AA" quarter-finals.

The Muskies faced off against the Elora Rocks in the "AA" quarter-finals.  Shelburne took control of the series early, winning the first two games by identical 6-3 scores to take a 2-0 series lead.  Elora fought back in the third game, defeating the Muskies 6-5 in overtime to get themselves back into the series.  The Muskies responded in the fourth game, defeating the Rocks 7-5 to take a commanding 3-1 series lead.  The Rocks staved off elimination in the fifth game, defeating Shelburne 7-4, however, the Muskies were able to close out the series in the sixth game, defeating Elora 8-7 in overtime to advance to the next round.

The Muskies next opponent would the Saugeen Shores Winterhawks in the "AA" semi-finals.  The Winterhawks took the series opener with by a close score of 4-3, followed by a dominating 6-1 victory in the second game to take a 2-0 series lead.  Saugeen Shores continued to have their way with the Muskies in the third game, easily defeating Shelburne 7-2 to push the Muskies on the brink of elimination.  Shelburne responded with a 6-0 victory in the fourth game, followed by a 5-4 win in the fifth game to cut the Winterhawks series lead to 3-2.  Shelburne would continue their comeback in the sixth game, winning 5-2 to even the series.  Saugeen Shores would spoil the Muskies comeback bid in the seventh game, ending Shelburne's season with an overtime victory to knock the Muskies out of the playoffs.

2009–18 Muskies season
Shelburne improved on their regular season record from the previous season, as they had an impressive 15-2-3 record, earning 33 points and a second-place finish in the WOAA North Division.  The Muskies had the second highest goal total in the league, scoring 127 goals, while they finished with a league best 54 goals against.

The Muskies faced the Palmerston 81's in the best of five "AA" qualifying series.  In the series opener, Shelburne easily handled Palmerston, defeating the 81's 6-3 to take the series lead.  The Muskies defeated the 81's in the second game by a 5-2 score, followed by a close 4-3 win in the third game to sweep the series and advance to the "AA" playoffs.

The Shelburne Muskies 2017-18 season took another step in the right direction with the team moving up to 5th place in the 13 team WOAA League with an 11-9-0 record up from the previous 2016-17 season record of 8-11-1 (11th place). The team went out 4 straight games to the Tillsonburg Thunder in the first round of the "AA" playoffs which was their first appearance in 7 years.  Luke Richardson was the team's top scorer in 2017-18 while Eddie Davey played the majority of the games in goal.

Season-by-season record
Note: GP = Games played, W = Wins, L = Losses, T= Tie, OTL = Overtime Losses, Pts = Points, GF = Goals for, GA = Goals against

More information will be added as more becomes available

Related links
Shelburne, Ontario
Western Ontario Athletic Association
WOAA Senior Hockey League

External links
WOAA Website
WOAA Senior Hockey Website

Senior ice hockey teams
Ice hockey teams in Ontario